The Hawkins–Simon condition refers to a result in mathematical economics, attributed to David Hawkins and Herbert A. Simon, that guarantees the existence of a non-negative output vector that solves the equilibrium relation in the input–output model where demand equals supply. More precisely, it states a condition for  under which the input–output system

has a solution  for any . Together, they describe a system in which

Rearranged and written in vector notation, this gives the first equation.

Then the Hawkins–Simon theorem states that the following two conditions are equivalent
(i) There exists an  such that .

For a proof, see Morishima (1964), Nikaido (1968), or Murata (1977). Condition (ii) is known as Hawkins–Simon condition. This theorem was independently discovered by David Kotelyanskiĭ, as it is referred to by Felix Gantmacher as Kotelyanskiĭ lemma.

See also 
 Diagonally dominant matrix
 Perron–Frobenius theorem

References

Further reading 
 
 

Theorems in linear algebra